Marina Piller (born 17 November 1984) is an Italian cross-country skier who has competed between 2006 and 2015. Her best World Cup finish was second twice (team sprint: 2009, 4 × 5 km relay: March 2010). Piller's best individual finish was fourth in a sprint event in China in 2007.

She has competed at the 2014 Winter Olympics, her best finish was 16th in the skiathlon event. In 2018, she was disqualified for doping retroactively, all her 2014 Olympic results were annulled.

Cross-country skiing results
All results are sourced from the International Ski Federation (FIS).

Olympic Games

World Championships

World Cup

Season standings

References

External links
 

1984 births
Living people
Italian female cross-country skiers
Tour de Ski skiers
Cross-country skiers at the 2014 Winter Olympics
Olympic cross-country skiers of Italy
Place of birth missing (living people)
Doping cases in cross-country skiing